Below are the results for the 2013 World Series of Poker Europe.

Key

Results

Event 1: €1,100 Ladies No Limit Hold'em
2-Day Event: October 11–12
Number of buy-ins: 65
Total Prize Pool: €62,400
Number of Payouts: 7
Winning Hand:

Event 2: €1,100 No Limit Hold'em Re-Entry
4-Day Event: October 12–15
Number of buy-ins: 659
Total Prize Pool: €632,640 
Number of Payouts: 72
Winning Hand:

Event 3: €5,300 Mixed Max No Limit Hold'em
4-Day Event: October 14–17
Number of buy-ins: 140
Total Prize Pool: €672,000
Number of Payouts: 16
Winning Hand:

Event 4: €1,650 Pot Limit Omaha
3-Day Event: October 15–17
Number of buy-ins: 184
Total Prize Pool: €270,480
Number of Payouts: 21
Winning Hand:

Event 5: €2,200 No Limit Hold'em
3-Day Event: October 16–18
Number of buy-ins: 337
Total Prize Pool: €647,040
Number of Payouts: 36
Winning Hand:

Event 6: €3,250 Mixed Max Pot Limit Omaha
3-Day Event: October 17–19
Number of buy-ins: 127
Total Prize Pool: €373,380
Number of Payouts: 16
Winning Hand:

Event 7: €10,450 No Limit Hold'em Main Event
7-Day Event: October 19–25
Number of buy-ins: 375
Total Prize Pool: €3,600,000
Number of Payouts: 40
Winning Hand:

Event 8: €25,600 High Roller No Limit Hold'em
3-Day Event: October 22–24
Number of buy-ins: 80
Total Prize Pool: €1,920,000
Number of Payouts: 9
Winning Hand: 

World Series of Poker Europe
World Series of Poker Europe Results, 2013